Ödön Beniczky de Benice et Micsinye (12 February 1878 – 20 January 1931) was a Hungarian legitimist politician, who served as Interior Minister between 1919 and 1920. He was a resolute adversary of Governor Miklós Horthy. He supported the king Charles IV in the king's attempts to retake the throne of Hungary. That is why Beniczky was arrested for a short time. He published his statement before the military public prosecutor's department in his newspaper ("Az Újság") about the White Terror. He was also arrested for two years. Beniczky's case was a huge scandal in Hungary, but the legitimists didn't use these happenings against the governor.

After the prison Beniczky failed as representative candidate. He committed suicide in 1931.

References
 Magyar Életrajzi Lexikon

1878 births
1931 suicides
People from Zvolen
Hungarian Interior Ministers
Hungarian monarchists
Hungarian politicians who committed suicide
Suicides by firearm in Hungary
1931 deaths
Lord-lieutenants of a county in Hungarian Kingdom